James Mancini (born September 29, 1984) is a Canadian-Italian wrestler and mixed martial artist. He most notably competed as a freestyle wrestler, representing Canada at the 2010 Commonwealth Games, winning a silver medal in the 60 kg category, having lost only to future Olympic medalist Yogeshwar Dutt.

A professional since 2013, Mancini has also competed in mixed martial arts. He most recently fought for Cage Fury Fighting Championships, where he is a former flyweight title challenger. He has also competed in the flyweight division of TKO Major League MMA, where he is a former flyweight title challenger. He is nicknamed Boom Boom.

References

Canadian male sport wrestlers
Commonwealth Games silver medallists for Canada
Living people
1984 births
Commonwealth Games medallists in wrestling
Wrestlers at the 2010 Commonwealth Games
Medallists at the 2010 Commonwealth Games